was a town located in Nishikunisaki District, Ōita Prefecture, Japan.

Population
As of 2003, the town had an estimated population of 3,808 and the density of 85.80 persons per km². The total area was 44.38 km².

Merge
On March 31, 2005, Matama, along with the town of Kakaji (also from Nishikunisaki District), was merged into the expanded city of Bungotakada.

Location
Matama town is located on the coast of Japan.

Dissolved municipalities of Ōita Prefecture